Gordon "Gord, Gordie" Laxton (born March 16, 1955 in Montreal, Quebec) is a Canadian former professional ice hockey goaltender who played for the Pittsburgh Penguins of the National Hockey League.

Playing career
Gordon Laxton played two seasons for the New Westminster Bruins of the WCHL before being selected in the 1975 NHL Draft by the Penguins.  Laxton was also drafted by the Michigan Stags in the 1975 WHA draft.

Laxton chose the NHL over the WHA and signed a contract with the Penguins. Laxton played 17 games for the Penguins during his 4 seasons in the NHL.

After his years in the NHL, Laxton played for several AHL and IHL teams, including the Muskegon Mohawks, Grand Rapids Owls, and Erie Blades.  Laxton retired in 1983.

See also
1975 NHL Amateur Draft
1975 WHA Amateur Draft

External links

1955 births
Living people
Binghamton Whalers players
Canadian ice hockey goaltenders
Erie Blades players
Grand Rapids Owls players
Hershey Bears players
Ice hockey people from Montreal
Michigan Stags draft picks
Muskegon Mohawks players
National Hockey League first-round draft picks
New Westminster Bruins players
Pittsburgh Penguins draft picks
Pittsburgh Penguins players
Port Huron Flags (IHL) players
Syracuse Firebirds players